Zbyněk Anthony Bohuslav Zeman (18 October 1928 – 22 June 2011) was a Czech historian who later became a naturalized British citizen. He published widely on the history of Central and Eastern Europe in the 20th century. As an academic, he taught at the Universities of St Andrews, Lancaster, Oxford and Prague.

He also worked for The Economist magazine and Amnesty International. In particular, Zeman was responsible for organising the translation into English of A Chronicle of Current Events, the samizdat periodical that documented human rights violations in the USSR from 1968 to 1982.

Selected works
 The Making and Breaking of Communist Europe (Paperback – November 1991)
 Pursued by a Bear: The Making of Eastern Europe (Hardcover – January 1989)
 Heckling Hitler: Caricatures of the Third Reich (Hardcover – 1 December 1987)
 Selling the War: Art & Propaganda in World War II (Hardcover – April 1982)
 The Masaryks: The making of Czechoslovakia (Hardcover – 1976)
 A diplomatic history of the First World War (Unknown binding – 1971)
 The Gentleman Negotiators: a diplomatic history of World War I (Hardcover – 1971)
 Twilight of the Habsburgs: the collapse of the Austro-Hungarian Empire (Paperback – 1971)
 Prague spring: A report on Czechoslovakia 1968 (published as a Penguin Special in 1969)
 The merchant of revolution : the life of Alexander Israel Helpland (Parvus) 1867–1924 (with Winfried B. Scharlau, Hardcover 1965)
 Nazi Propaganda (Hardcover – 1 January 1964)
 The Break-Up of the Habsburg Empire 1914–1918 – A Study in National and Social Revolution (Hardcover – 1961)
 Germany and the Revolution in Russia, 1915–1918: Documents from the Archives of the German Foreign Ministry (1958)

References

20th-century Czech historians
20th-century British historians
Academics of Lancaster University
Academic staff of Charles University
Academics of the University of St Andrews
Fellows of St Antony's College, Oxford
Fellows of St Edmund Hall, Oxford
The Economist people
1928 births
2011 deaths
People from Prague
Czechoslovak emigrants to the United Kingdom